Figure skating at the 2018 Olympic Winter Games was held at the Gangneung Ice Arena in Gangneung, South Korea. The five events took place between 9 and 23 February 2018.

Qualification 

A total of 148 quota spots were available to athletes to compete at the games. Each NOC could enter a maximum of 18 athletes, with a maximum of nine men and nine women. An additional six quota spots were made available for the team event. A further ten team trophy quotas (two in each discipline) were distributed to countries who qualified for the team event but not the discipline itself. This meant up to a maximum of 158 athletes could participate.

Competition schedule 
The following was the competition schedule for all five events. Sessions that included the event finals are shown in bold.

All times are (UTC+9).

Medal summary

Medal table

Events 

 Skaters who only competed in the short program/dance.
 Skaters who only competed in the free program/dance.

Entries 
Countries began announcing their entries in 2017. The International Skating Union published the complete list on 30 January 2018.

 Isabella Tobias and Ilia Tkachenko, who qualified an ice dance spot for Israel, were replaced by Tankova and Zilberberg because Tkachenko's application for Israeli citizenship was denied.
 Alexander Majorov was unable to achieve the performance level required by the Swedish Olympic Committee; thus, the Committee gave up the corresponding quota for men's singles.
 Ksenia Stolbova and Ivan Bukin were not invited to the 2018 Winter Olympics by the International Olympic Committee.
 The Olympic Committee of the Democratic People's Republic of Korea failed to submit paperwork on time and thus lost their pairs spot qualified by Ryom Tae-ok and Kim Ju-sik. The International Olympic Committee later awarded the country a wild-card spot following negotiations between North and South Korea.

Records and firsts 

The following new ISU best scores were set during this competition.

Participating nations 
The following National Olympic Committees earned spots to compete.
153 athletes from 32 nations were expected to participate, with number of athletes in parentheses. Malaysia made their Olympic debuts in the sport.

 (4)
 (2)
 (2)
 (1)
 (17)
 (11)
 (5)
 (1)
 (8)
 (1)
 (8)
 (2)
 (1)
 (7)
 (11)
 (9)
 (3)
 (2)
 (1)
 (2)
 (15)
 (1)
 (2)
 (3)
 (7)
 (4)
 (1)
 (1)
 (2)
 (4)
 (14)
 (1)

References

Citations

External links 

Official Results Book – Figure skating

 
2018
2018 Winter Olympics events
Winter Olympics
International figure skating competitions hosted by South Korea